Jungle Drums (1943) is the fifteenth of seventeen animated Technicolor short films based upon the DC Comics character of Superman. Produced by Famous Studios, the cartoon was originally released to theaters by Paramount Pictures on March 26, 1943.

Plot 
Deep in the African jungle, a tribe of aboriginal warriors are having a celebration. Their leader is a tall man in a white cloak. Secretly, he's a Nazi commander, and the tribe's sacred temple is actually an underground Nazi outpost. The Nazis eagerly await the arrival of an American convoy with information about an Allied attack. When a military plane flies overhead, the Nazis shoot it down. The commander sends the warriors to search for survivors.

At the wreck site, the mortally wounded Lieutenant hands his secret documents to the crew's only survivor, Lois Lane. He tells her to destroy the documents, and then he dies. Lois is caught by the natives and tied up, but she frees herself, then runs into the jungle and avoids capture long enough to hide the documents under a rock. She is then captured and brought back to the temple for interrogation where she is tied to a chair. When she refuses to talk, the commander orders the warriors to burn her at the stake.

Meanwhile, Clark Kent and another pilot are flying out to meet with Lois's convoy. They spot the wrecked plane not far from the aboriginal village. Clark parachutes down to investigate. Once on the ground, he changes into Superman. He flies to the village. Lois is already being burned at the stake with the commander watching her. Just then, one of the warriors approaches the commander and gives him the documents Lois hid in the woods. Overjoyed with success, the commander has his men radio headquarters and send the Nazi U-boats to attack the Allied fleet.

Superman arrives and saves Lois from burning to death. When the warriors see a man who can walk through fire, they run in terror. The Nazi soldiers futilely fight back against Superman. Meanwhile, Lois takes a spare white cloak and sneaks in to use the radio. The commander catches her but before he can do anything to stop her, Superman comes to her rescue. She sends a message to the American headquarters, warning them about the Nazi subs.

Out at sea, the Nazi subs prepare to decimate the Allied fleet. Before they can attack, they are bombed by a squadron of Allied B-26 bombers sent in response to Lois' warnings. The subs are destroyed, and the Allied fleet is saved.

Meanwhile, in Berlin during a thunderstorm, Adolf Hitler listens to a newsflash about the defeat of his U-boat force. Angered, he flips a switch on the radio and hangs his head in frustration as the tune Praise the Lord and Pass the Ammunition is heard.

Reception
On April 29, 1943, The Film Daily said: "It's all wild, woolly, and in two words, in credible!"

Voice cast 
 Bud Collyer as Clark Kent / Superman
 Joan Alexander as Lois Lane
 Jackson Beck as the Narrator
 Jack Mercer as First Pilot, Lt. Fleming
 Julian Noa as German Commander

References

External links
 
 
 

1943 films
1943 animated films
1940s American animated films
1940s animated short films
1940s animated superhero films
Superman animated shorts
1943 adventure films
Cultural depictions of Adolf Hitler
Films set in Africa
American World War II propaganda shorts
Paramount Pictures short films
Films about race and ethnicity
Jungle adventure films
American adventure films